Londonderry City was a constituency represented in the Irish House of Commons until 1800.

Members of Parliament
1613–1615: George Cary and Thomas Crewe
1634–1635: Sir Robert Farrar and Robert Goodwin
1639–1649: Sir Robert Stewart and Sir Francis Butler
1661–1666: John Godbold (died and replaced 1665 by John Gorges) and Hugh Edwards

1692–1801

Notes

References

Constituencies of the Parliament of Ireland (pre-1801)
History of Derry (city)
Politics of Derry (city)
1800 disestablishments in Ireland
Constituencies disestablished in 1800